Elim Christian College is a state-integrated coeducational  secondary school located in Botany Downs, a suburb of Manukau City, Auckland, New Zealand.

Established in 1988, the school currently caters for approximately 1000 students from new entrants to Year 13, including over 50 international students. The school is associated with Elim Christian Centre.

On 15 April 2008, six students and a teacher from the school died in a flash flood while canyoning the Mangatepopo Stream in Tongariro National Park. In 2011 Principal Murray Burton was made a Member of the New Zealand Order of Merit, and the teacher and one of the six students who died given medals for bravery.

Elim integrated with Hebron Christian College in 2018.

See also
List of schools in Auckland, New Zealand
Mangatepopo Canyon Disaster

References

External links
 Elim Christian College website

Educational institutions established in 1988
Primary schools in Auckland
Secondary schools in Auckland
Christian schools in New Zealand
Christianity in Auckland
1988 establishments in New Zealand